Apostibes inota is a moth of the family Scythrididae. It was described by Edward Meyrick in 1924. It is found in Pakistan, northern India and eastern Afghanistan.

The length of the forewings is 12.5–14 mm. The forewings are whitish with longitudinal light brown longitudinal striae, more or less following the veins. The hindwings are whitish with a metallic hue, and a darker fringe.

References

Scythrididae
Moths described in 1924
Moths of Asia